Shah Rahzan (also Romanized as Shāh Rāhzan; also known as Boneh-ye Shāh Rezā ‘Arab, Bunneh Shāh Rahzan Arab, and Shāh Rāzan) is a village in Qaleh Tall Rural District, in the Central District of Bagh-e Malek County, Khuzestan Province, Iran. At the 2006 census, its population was 68, in 16 families.

References 

Populated places in Bagh-e Malek County